Yugoslav Youth Association Against AIDS – Youth of JAZAS is non-profit, humanitarian organization committed to HIV prevention and support to the people living with HIV.
Ever since its establishment in 1994, it has continuously been implementing projects of peer education, social and psychological support, protection of human rights, promoting voluntary activism, distribution of condoms etc.

In addition, the Youth of JAZAS is also dedicated to vulnerable groups: people of different sexual orientations, sex workers, drug users, young Romani population, MARA (most at risk adolescents). Also, the work of this organization includes education of health care providers, the police, public prosecutors, judges and Members of Parliament, ensuring that people living with HIV and vulnerable groups are involved in policy making processes at national and local level, and have their mandatory contribution to policies that guarantee their human rights and antidiscriminatory attitudes in Serbian Society.

Eleven non-governmental organizations in Serbia share the same name, the same visual identity, goal and values of the Youth of JAZAS, working together according to Memorandum of cooperation in the following cities: Belgrade, Novi Sad, Požarevac, Pančevo, Valjevo, Kragujevac, Niš, Užice, Kosovska Mitrovica, Zaječar and Žitište.

Activities

Peer education program 

The Youth of JAZAS has 16-year-long experience in programs of peer education, training them to become educators, starting with educating the young people of the similar age, continuing with becoming trainers about HIV/AIDS themselves. Within this program 230 000 people in Serbia were trained.
Since its establishment, the Youth of JAZAS has chosen this kind of education and enabled young people to acquire the knowledge from their peers on the matters they are mostly concerned about: sensitive subjects of the HIV/AIDS, STDs and substance dependence. Two very important manuals for young generations in Serbia have been created in the year 2000: the Manual for HIV/AIDS and the Manual of infectious diseases for peer educators which contain all the relevant information for their work. In 2003, the project My right to know has been initiated by the Youth of JAZAS in cooperation with UNICEF and five nongovernmental organizations: CEDEUM (Centre for education in drama and art), CRPHO (Centre for promotion of humane relations), SPY (Safe plus of youth), Friends of the children of Serbia i Roma educational centre.

SOS and informational services 

This segment includes peer educators, as well as psychological and social support for people living with HIV. Operators in this area have been trained for their work through tuition with educators specially prepared for this, with social workers and psychologists.

Social marketing program 

Activities of this organization include: production and distribution of advertising materials in Serbian and the languages of minorities living in Serbia, free distribution of more than 300 000 condoms per year, raising awareness of the society through media campaigns and outdoor activities which, amongst other things, include the preparation of the campaigns every November and December for the World AIDS Day that include street performances, concerts, fashion shows, film projections, theatre performances, art exhibitions and other activities.

Support to people living with HIV and vulnerable groups 

The project „Acceptance and Participation of People Living with HIV in Serbian Society” contributed to increasing  the role of PLHIV, reinforcing their position in the society, organizing self-help groups and coordination of their activities, their integration in National association of PLHIV and promoting the fight against discrimination, all that for contributing to making sustainable mechanisms that would successfully protect human rights and allow them full access to public services and necessary therapy. PLHIV participation and lobbying for the overall improvement of their rights, establishment of National AIDS experts group which focuses on legislation concerning the matter and the establishment of the first informal Parliamentary group for HIV/AIDS in Serbian Parliament, helped PLHIV to speak freely and openly about their status, making their overall status and approach to prevention and therapy better. Further activities that have been planned include support to PLHIV Union and helping them to connect to relevant European networks, lobbying for permanent parliamentary group and continuing work of the Experts Group on urgent questions such are: the shortage of continuous control and therapy for PLHIV in prisons, the lack of CD4 and PCR tests or the change of legislation that criminalizes HIV transmission. This project was financed by the European Commission and implemented in cooperation with Hivos (Stichting Humanistisch Instituut voor Ontwikkelingssamenwerking – Humanist Institute for Co-operation with Developing Countries) from Netherlands during the period from 2008 until April 2011.

Cooperation with the Global Fund to Fight AIDS, Tuberculosis and Malaria 

Within Round 8 Global Fund to Fight AIDS, Tuberculosis and Malaria, the Youth if JAZAS has been provided  with means for the implementation of the Serbian national program „Strengthening HIV Prevention and Care for the Groups Most Vulnerable to HIV/AIDS” from 2009. This program’s goal is to develop and strengthen national response to HIV epidemics in Serbia and to accomplish these goals:
 Securing the appropriate approach in the comprehensive prevention, treatment, caretaking and providing support to vulnerable groups;
 Enhancing the quality of caretaking and providing support to people living with HIV;
 Creating of supporting society background that would reinforce PLHIV;
 Empowering the system for tracking epidemics among the groups exposed to the highest risk.
Within the Round 8, Global Fund has granted Serbia financing to implement the national program "Strengthening HIV Prevention and Care for the Groups Most Vulnerable to HIV/AIDS" of 12.406.231 euros total.
In April 2003 Global Fund has, within Round 1, granted 3.575.210 US dollars for implementation of the activities from the project “Control of HIV/AIDS in Serbia: Making of full scale state’s strategy and non-scheduled action plan”.
In October 2006 five year long project of maximum 9 million euros for fighting against AIDS in Serbia has been granted for the period from 2007 to 2012.
The whole project implementation by the Youth of JAZAS has been divided into different sectors of service provision. These include: intravenous drug users, commercial sex workers, adolescents at highest risk - MARA (Most At Risk Adolescents), young Romani decision makers, PLHIV as well as International Help Network from Belgrade for reduction of stigma in all environments, strengthening of civil society and all participants on gender issues and institutional increase of capacities.

Activities for the World AIDS Day

Reception by the Lady Speaker of Serbian Parliament 

On the occasion of the World AIDS Day on 1 December 2009 and for the first time ever, since the beginning of the epidemics of HIV in Serbia, self-help groups were received by the National Assembly Speaker, Slavica Đukić Dejanović. This opportunity for the self-help groups to present their problems on such a high level was initiated by the Youth of JAZAS for the fifteen-year anniversary of the Organization. The intention was to present issues PLHIV in Serbia are facing, especially treatment issues, to discuss the possibilities of support from the National Assembly of Serbia in terms of creating the legal frame for improvement of PLHIV's treatment and status, namely the legislation of the transmission of HIV and all this resulted in Lady Speaker’s address to Prime Minister of Republic of Serbia on the very matter of the discussion.

Activities on the occasion of the World AIDS Day

The Youth of JAZAS organizes different activities for 1 December aimed to the fight against HIV/AIDS and to the contribution to reduction of existing stigma and discrimination in Serbian society. These include seminars, expert gatherings, addresses of the Minister of Health, Institute of Public Health representatives, members of PLHIV population, lectures about HIV, concerts and street performances supported by numerous nongovernmental organizations, state institutions and celebrities. On this occasion, brochures and educational materials about health are being distributed, visitors informed about HIV/AIDS and other STD's and about the most recent information about the epidemics.

References

External links 
 PLHIV
 HIVOS

Medical and health organizations based in Serbia
HIV/AIDS organizations
1994 establishments in Serbia